FR Yugoslavia competed at the 2001 Mediterranean Games held in Tunis, Tunisia.

Medals by sport

List of Medalists

References
 Olympic Committee of Serbia - 2001 Mediterranean Games
 2001 Mediterranean Games Official Results

Nations at the 2001 Mediterranean Games
2